Brett Alexander Wallace (born August 26, 1986) is an American former professional baseball infielder. He played in Major League Baseball (MLB) for the Houston Astros and San Diego Padres.

High school
A 2005 graduate of Justin-Siena High School in Napa, California, Wallace earned four varsity baseball letters for head coach Allen Rossi. He helped lead Justin-Siena to a 97–9 record during his prep career, including a perfect 27–0 senior season. He broke nine school records during his prep career and holds single-season school records for walks, runs, hits, RBI, home runs and slugging percentage. Among his numerous accolades, Wallace was named a Collegiate Baseball/Louisville Slugger All-American and 2005 first-team All-State (CalHiSports.com) and 2005 California Small Schools Player of the Year. He was also a four-time All-Marin County Athletic League selection, 2004 and 2005 All-Napa County Offensive Player of the Year.

College career
Wallace was a two-time Pac-10 Player of the Year (2007 & 2008) and a two-time Triple Crown Winner at Arizona State University. He was the 12th Sun Devil to win the Pac-10 Player of the Year award, and the first since Dustin Pedroia shared the award in 2003.

Wallace played 3B for the Sun Devils, teaming with now Los Angeles Dodgers first baseman Ike Davis at 1B and now Cleveland Indians second baseman Jason Kipnis in center field. The 2008 ASU squad also featured current St. Louis Cardinals pitcher Mike Leake and former San Diego Padres pitcher Josh Spence. In 2006, he played collegiate summer baseball with the Falmouth Commodores of the Cape Cod Baseball League and was named a league all-star.

Professional career

Early career
The Toronto Blue Jays selected Wallace in the 42nd round of the 2005 MLB Draft, but he did not sign with the team. After his collegiate career, he was picked by the St. Louis Cardinals as their first round (13th overall) selection of the 2008 MLB draft out of Arizona State University. After his performance at Single-A Quad Cities, Wallace skipped High-A Palm Beach and was promoted immediately to the Double-A Springfield. He began 2009 playing for Springfield before being promoted to the Triple-A Memphis Redbirds. During his career in the minor leagues, Wallace split time between first base and third base.

On July 24, 2009, Wallace was traded to the Oakland Athletics as part of a package for outfielder Matt Holliday.

On December 15, 2009, Wallace was dealt to the Toronto Blue Jays for Michael Taylor, who was obtained by the Blue Jays from the Philadelphia Phillies as part of a trade for Roy Halladay.

Houston Astros

On July 29, 2010, he was traded again, this time to the Houston Astros, in exchange for minor league outfielder Anthony Gose, who had just been obtained by the Astros from the Phillies as part of a trade for Roy Oswalt.  Wallace was sent to the Triple-A affiliate, the Round Rock Express, for one day and did not appear in a game before being called up by the Astros on July 31, 2010 after Lance Berkman was traded to the New York Yankees.
Wallace made his MLB debut against the Milwaukee Brewers the same day, and went 0–4. On August 1, he got his first MLB career hit, a single, against Brewers' pitcher Randy Wolf. On September 7 Wallace hit his first MLB career home run off Chicago Cubs pitcher Carlos Silva, tying the game.

On August 1, 2011, Wallace was sent back to the Triple-A Oklahoma City RedHawks club.

Wallace started the 2012 season with the RedHawks, and was recalled by Houston on June 3 when Carlos Lee was placed on the disabled list.  He returned to Oklahoma City on June 17 when Lee was re-activated. Wallace was recalled again on July 30 when Brian Bixler was optioned to Oklahoma City.

Wallace began the 2013 season with the Astros. However, due to a slow start in which he batted .042 in 17 games, he was optioned to Oklahoma City on April 18. On June 25, he was called back up to start against the St. Louis Cardinals.

On February 6, 2014, the Astros designated Wallace for assignment to make room for Jerome Williams.  He was released on March 12.

Return to the minors
Wallace signed a Minor League contract with the Baltimore Orioles on March 23.

He played for the Triple-A Norfolk Tides before being traded to the Blue Jays on July 14 for cash considerations. He was assigned to the Triple-A Buffalo Bisons of the International League.

On August 24, 2014, Wallace clubbed a walk-off grand slam in the 12th inning to cap a three home run, six RBI game, as the Bisons rallied for a 10–6 victory over visiting Pawtucket Red Sox. Wallace joined Fernando Martínez (2012) and Marco Scutaro (1999) as the only Bisons to hit walk-off grand slams at Coca-Cola Field. It was also the sixth three-homer game in franchise history and the first since May 19, 2012, when Vinny Rottino achieved the feat against the Indianapolis Indians.

San Diego Padres
On December 13, 2014, Wallace signed a minor-league contract including an invitation to major-league spring training with the San Diego Padres.

On June 19, 2015, the Padres called Wallace up. He finished the season with a .302/.374/.521 slash line in 107 plate appearances for the Padres. The following off season, the Padres and Wallace avoided arbitration by agreeing to a $1 million contract for 2016. Wallace was given the starting third base job when Yangervis Solarte was placed on the disabled list with a hamstring injury. Wallace failed to repeat his 2015 production in 2016, finishing the season with a .189/.309/.318 slash line in 256 plate appearances. He was outrighted off the Padres' 40-man roster after the season.

In December 2016, Wallace signed a new minor league contract with the Padres. On April 2, 2017, he was released.

Wallace ended his career following the 2017 season.

References

External links

1986 births
Living people
All-American college baseball players
Arizona State Sun Devils baseball players
Baseball players at the 2007 Pan American Games
Baseball players from California
Buffalo Bisons (minor league) players
El Paso Chihuahuas players
Falmouth Commodores players
Houston Astros players
Las Vegas 51s players
Leones del Escogido players
American expatriate baseball players in the Dominican Republic
Major League Baseball first basemen
Memphis Redbirds players
Norfolk Tides players
Oklahoma City RedHawks players
Pan American Games medalists in baseball
Pan American Games silver medalists for the United States
People from Sonoma, California
Peoria Saguaros players
Quad Cities River Bandits players
Sacramento River Cats players
San Diego Padres players
Springfield Cardinals players
United States national baseball team players
Medalists at the 2007 Pan American Games